IEMA may refer to:
Interactive Entertainment Merchants Association
Institute of Environmental Management and Assessment
Inland Empire Museum of Art, now known as the Sasse Museum of Art